Maria Ciulei is a Romanian handball coach, who initiated and coached world-renowned handball players and led her teams to eleven national titles and two European titles. In 1989, she was ranked by the International Handball Federation among top ten handball coaches in Europe. She resides in Râmnicu Vâlcea, Romania.

Coaching results
 1982: National champion with CSS Făgăraș, Romania (girls, 16-17 years of age)
 1984: Winners EHF Cup with CS Oltchim Râmnicu Vâlcea (with Professor Popescu Constantin) (1st League women)
 1984: EHF Women's Champions Trophy with CS Oltchim Râmnicu Vâlcea, Chimistul Râmnicu Vâlcea  (with Professor Ion Gerhard) (1st League women)
 1989: National champion with CS Oltchim Râmnicu Vâlcea, Romania (girls, 18-19 years of age)
 1995: National champion with CS Oltchim Râmnicu Vâlcea, Romania (girls, 18-19 years of age)
 1996: Third Place national championship with CS Oltchim Râmnicu Vâlcea, Romania (girls, 14-15 years of age)
 1997: National vice champion with CS Oltchim Râmnicu Vâlcea, Romania (girls, 16-17 years of age)
 1998: National champion with CS Oltchim Râmnicu Vâlcea, Romania (girls, 18-19 years of age)
 2000: National champion with CS Oltchim Râmnicu Vâlcea, Romania (girls, 14-15 years of age)
 2002: National vice champion with CS Oltchim Râmnicu Vâlcea, Romania (girls, 16-17 years of age)
 2009: National vice champion with HC Oltenia, Romania (girls, 12-13 years of age)
 2011: National champion with AS 181 SSP Bucuresti, Romania (girls, 16-17 years of age), national vice champion with AS 181 SSP Bucuresti, Romania (girls, 14-15 years of age)
 2014: National champion with HCM Török, Romania (girls, 8-12 years of age)

Initiated and coached
 Liliana Topea:
 European champion with Lutzenlinden, Germany (1990)
 3 times European champion with Hypobank Vienna (1991–1994) represented Austria at the 1994 Olympic Games
 Carmen Niţescu:
 Rumanian youth and women's national team
 Youth world champion (1995)
 EHF vice champion with Gyor, Hungary (2004)
 Cristina Dogaru, Monica Iacob, Carcadia Florentina:
 Rumanian youth and women's national team
 Roşca Isabela, Ilie Alina, Andrei Iulia, Bucă Oana
 Gold medal at the IHF Women's Junior World Championship (2015)
 Mădălina Zamfirescu
 2016 European Women's Handball Championship
 Alina Ilie 
 Silver medal at the IHF Women's Youth World Championship (2016)
 Madalina Zamfirescu, Alina Ilie
 Members of the Romania women's national handball team (2017)

Coached
	 Cristina Vărzaru, Oana Manea, Roxana Gatzel-Han, Adina Meiroşu, Aurelia Stoica, Steluța Luca

References

External links 
 Official website
 Campioana de pe banca de rezerve
 Romania U18 Campioana Mondiala
 Junioarele IV de la HCM Campioane Nationale
 
 
 Viitorul handbalului feminin valcean suna bine
 
 

Year of birth missing (living people)
Living people
Sportspeople from Râmnicu Vâlcea
Romanian handball coaches